Nordic folklore is the folklore of Denmark, Norway, Sweden, Iceland and the Faroe Islands. It has common roots with, and has been mutually influenced by, folklore in England, Germany, the Low Countries, the Baltic countries, Finland and Sapmi. Folklore is a concept encompassing expressive traditions of a particular culture or group. The peoples of Scandinavia are heterogenous, as are the oral genres and material culture that has been common in their lands. However, there are some commonalities across Scandinavian folkloric traditions, among them a common ground in elements from Norse mythology as well as Christian conceptions of the world.

Among the many tales common in Scandinavian oral traditions, some have become known beyond Scandinavian borders – examples include The Three Billy Goats Gruff and The Giant Who Had No Heart in His Body.

Beings
A large number of different mythological creatures from Scandinavian folklore have become well known in other parts of the world, mainly through popular culture and fantasy genres. Some of these are:

Trolls
Troll (Norwegian and Swedish), trolde (Danish) is a designation for several types of human-like supernatural beings in Scandinavian folklore. They are mentioned in the Edda (1220) as a monster with many heads. Later, trolls became characters in fairy tales, legends and ballads. They play a main part in many of the fairy tales from Asbjørnsen and Moes collections of Norwegian tales (1844). Trolls may be compared to many supernatural beings in other cultures, for instance the Cyclopes of Homer's Odyssey. In Swedish, such beings are often termed 'jätte' (giant), a word related to the Norse 'jotun'. The origins of the word troll is uncertain.

Trolls are described in many ways in Scandinavian folk literature, but they are often portrayed as stupid, and slow to act. In fairy tales and legends about trolls, the plot is often that a human with courage and presence of mind can outwit a troll. Sometimes saints' legends involve a holy man tricking an enormous troll to build a church. Trolls come in many different shapes and forms, and are generally not fair to behold, as they can have as many as nine heads. Trolls live throughout the land. They dwell in mountains, under bridges, and at the bottom of lakes. Trolls who live in the mountains may be rich and, hoarding mounds of gold and silver in their cliff dwellings. Dovregubben, a troll king, lives inside the Dovre Mountains with his court, as described in detail in Ibsen's Peer Gynt.

Elves

Elves (in Swedish, Älva if female and Alv if male, Alv in Norwegian, and Elver in Danish) are in some parts mostly described as female (in contrast to the light and dark elves in the Edda), otherworldly, beautiful and seductive residents of forests, meadows and mires. They are skilled in magic and illusions. Sometimes they are described as small fairies, sometimes as full-sized women and sometimes as half transparent spirits, or a mix thereof. They are closely linked to the mist and it is often said in Sweden that, "the Elves are dancing in the mist". The female form of Elves may have originated from the female deities called Dís (singular) and Díser (plural) found in pre-Christian Scandinavian religion. They were very powerful spirits closely linked to the seid magic. Even today the word "dis" is a synonym for mist or very light rain in Swedish, Norwegian and Danish. Particularly in Denmark, the female elves have merged with the dangerous and seductive huldra, skogsfrun or "keeper of the forest", often called hylde. In some parts of Sweden the elves also share features with the Skogsfrun, "Huldra", or "Hylda", and can seduce and bewitch careless men and suck the life out of them or make them go down in the mire and drown. But at the same time the Skogsrå exists as its own being, with other distinct features clearly separating it from the elves. In more modern tales, it isn't uncommon for a rather ugly male Tomte, Troll, Vätte or a Dwarf to fall in love with a beautiful Elven female, as the beginning of a story of impossible or forbidden love.

Huldra
The Hulda, Hylda, Skogsrå or Skogfru (Forest wife/woman) is a dangerous seductress who lives in the forest. The Huldra is said to lure men with her charm. She has a long cow's tail, or according to some traditions, that of a fox, which she ties under her skirt in order to hide it from men. If she can manage to get married in a church, her tail falls off and she becomes human.

Nattmara
In Scandinavia, there was the Nattmara. The Mara (or, in English, "nightmare") appears as a skinny young woman, dressed in a nightgown, with pale skin and long black hair and nails. After turning into sand, they could slip through the slimmest crack in the wood of a wall and terrorize the sleeping by "riding" on their chest, thus giving them nightmares. (This appears to describe "apparitions" commonly seen and/or felt during episodes of sleep paralysis.) The Mara traditionally rode on cattle, which would be left drained of energy and with tangled fur at the Mara's touch. Trees would curl up and wilt at the Mara's touch as well. In some tales, like the Banshee, they served as an omen of death. If one were to leave a dirty doll in a family living room, one of the members would soon fall ill and die of tuberculosis. ("Lung soot", another name for tuberculosis, referred to the effect of proper chimneys in 18th through 19th century homes. Inhabitants would therefore contract diseases due to inhaling smoke on a daily basis.)

There was some discrepancy as to how they came into being. Some stories say that the Maras are restless children, whose souls leave their body at night to haunt the living. Another tale explains that if a pregnant woman pulled a horse placenta over her head before giving birth, the child would be delivered safely; however, if it were a son, he would become a werewolf, and if a daughter, a Mara.

Nøkken

Nøkken, näcken, or strömkarlen, is a dangerous fresh water-dwelling creature. The nøkk plays a fiddle to lure his victims out onto thin ice on foot or onto water in leaky boats, then draws them down to the bottom of the water where he is waiting for them. The nøkk is also a shapeshifter, who usually changes into a horse or a man in order to lure victims to him.

Storsjöodjuret 
Storsjöodjuret (The Great Lake Monster) is a lake monster said to live in the 90-metre-deep (300 ft) lake Storsjön in Jämtland in the middle of Sweden, the same time as the Loch Ness Monster from Scotland.

Selma 
Selma is a legendary sea serpent said to live in the 13-kilometre-long (8-mile) Lake Seljord (Seljordsvatnet) in Seljord, Vestfold og Telemark, Norway.

Kraken 
The Kraken is a legendary sea-monster, resembling a giant octopus or squid said to appear off the coasts of Norway.

Others

The Nisse (in southern Sweden, Norway and Denmark) or tomte (in Sweden) is a benevolent wight who takes care of the house and barn when the farmer is asleep, but only if the farmer reciprocates by setting out food for the nisse and he himself also takes care of his family, farm and animals. If the nisse is ignored or maltreated or the farm is not cared for, he is likely to sabotage the work instead to teach the farmer a lesson. Although the nisse should be treated with respect, some tales warn against treating him too kindly. There's a Swedish story in which a farmer and his wife entered their barn early in the morning and found a little, old, grey man sweeping the floor. They saw his clothing, which was nothing more than torn rags, and the wife decided to make him some new ones; when the nisse found them in the barn, however, he considered himself too elegant to perform any more farm labour and thus disappeared from the farm. Nisser are also associated with Christmas and the yule time. Farmers customarily place bowls of rice porridge on their doorsteps to please the nisser, comparative to the cookies and milk left out for Santa Claus in other cultures. Some believe that the nisse brings them presents as well. In Swedish, the word Tomten (Tomte in singular) is very closely linked to the word for the plot of land where a house or cottage is built, which spells the same both in singular and plural (Tomten/tomterna) but is pronounced with slightly longer vocals. Therefore, some scholars believe that the wight Tomten originates from some sort of general house god or deity from before the Asa belief. A Nisse/Tomte is said to be able to change his size between that of a 5-year-old child and a thumb, and also to have the ability to make himself invisible.

A type of wight from Northern Sweden called Vittra lives underground, is invisible most of the time and has its own cattle. Most of the time Vittra are rather distant and do not meddle in human affairs, but are fearsome when enraged. This can be achieved by not respecting them properly, for example by neglecting to perform certain rituals (such as saying "look out" when putting out hot water or going to the toilet so they can move out of the way) or building your home too close to or, even worse, on top of their home, disturbing their cattle or blocking their roads. They can make your life very very miserable or even dangerous – they do whatever it takes to drive you away, even arrange accidents that will harm or even kill you. Even in modern days, people have rebuilt or moved houses in order not to block a "Vittra-way", or moved from houses that are deemed a "Vittra-place" (Vittra ställe) because of bad luck – although this is rather uncommon. In tales told in the north of Sweden, Vittra often take the place that trolls, tomte and vättar hold in the same stories told in other parts of the country. Vittra are believed to sometimes "borrow" cattle that later would be returned to the owner with the ability to give more milk as a sign of gratitude. This tradition is heavily influenced by the fact that it was developed during a time when people let their cattle graze on mountains or in the forest for long periods of the year.

The circhos is a sea creature that looks like a man with three toes on each foot. Its skin is black and red. It has a long left foot and a small right foot which drags behind, making it lean left when walking.

See also
 Birgit Ridderstedt
 Danish folklore
 Henrik Ibsen's 1867 play Peer Gynt
 Huldufólk
 John Bauer (illustrator)
 Norse mythology
 Norske Folkeeventyr, a collection of Norwegian folktales
 Thunderstone (folklore)

References

Citations

Sources

  (1964). Folktales of Norway
  (1988). Scandinavian Folk Belief and Legend University of Minnesota. 
  (2003). The World of Tolkien: Mythological Sources of The Lord of the Rings 
  (1868). Giants and Dwarfs. London: Folcroft Library.
  (1961). "Folklore Trends in Scandinavia" in Dorson, Richard M. Folklore Research around the World. Indiana University Press.
  (1961). Norwegian Folklore Simplified. Trans. Toni Rambolt. Chester Springs, PA: Dufour Editions.
  (1896). Scandinavian Folklore: Illustrations of the Traditional Beliefs of the Northern People. London: Alexander Garnder
  (1996). Spirits, Fairies, Leprechauns, and Goblins. New York: W.W. Norton & Company 
  (1956). Scandinavian Legends and Folk-tales. New York: Oxford University
  (24 June 2009). The Tomte and Other Scandinavian Folklore Creatures. Community of Sweden. Visit Sweden. Web. 4 May 2010.
  (1948). The Celtic and Scandinavian Religions. Chicago: Academy Chicago

External links

 Norwegian folktales in English translation